Crocanthes is a genus of moths in the family Lecithoceridae.

Species
Crocanthes acroxantha Lower, 1896
Crocanthes carcharias Meyrick, 1910
Crocanthes celema Durrant, 1915
Crocanthes characotis Meyrick, 1916
Crocanthes chordotona Meyrick, 1916
Crocanthes cleomorpha Meyrick, 1931
Crocanthes crypsichola Durrant, 1915
Crocanthes cyclopsana Park, 2011
Crocanthes diula Meyrick, 1904
Crocanthes doliopa Meyrick, 1921
Crocanthes epitherma Lower, 1896
Crocanthes eurypyra Meyrick, 1918
Crocanthes fallax Durrant, 1915
Crocanthes gatoralis Park, 2011
Crocanthes gelastis Meyrick, 1918
Crocanthes glycina Meyrick, 1904
Crocanthes halurga Meyrick, 1904
Crocanthes hecuba Meyrick, 1931
Crocanthes heliocharis Diakonoff, 1954
Crocanthes heliograpta Meyrick, 1929
Crocanthes hemipyra Meyrick, 1938
Crocanthes ignea Meyrick, 1925
Crocanthes leucodonta Diakonoff, 1954
Crocanthes megalophthalma Diakonoff, 1954
Crocanthes micradelpha (Lower, 1897)
Crocanthes monodesma Meyrick, 1931
Crocanthes pancala (Turner, 1919)
Crocanthes perigrapta Meyrick, 1904
Crocanthes phaeograpta Meyrick, 1931
Crocanthes phoenoteles Meyrick, 1929
Crocanthes platycitra Meyrick, 1931
Crocanthes poliozona Park, 2011
Crocanthes prasinopis Meyrick, 1886
Crocanthes protoma Diakonoff, 1954
Crocanthes pyrochorda (Meyrick, 1910)
Crocanthes pyrostola Diakonoff, 1954
Crocanthes rhodantha Meyrick, 1918
Crocanthes sceletopa Meyrick, 1910
Crocanthes sceptrophora Diakonoff, 1954
Crocanthes scioxantha Meyrick, 1910
Crocanthes sidonia Meyrick, 1910
Crocanthes sphecotypa Meyrick, 1933
Crocanthes symmochlopa Meyrick, 1929
Crocanthes temeraria Meyrick, 1910
Crocanthes thalamectis Meyrick, 1929
Crocanthes thermobapta Lower, 1920
Crocanthes thermocharis Meyrick, 1931
Crocanthes thiomorpha Turner, 1933
Crocanthes triglenopa Meyrick, 1929
Crocanthes trizona Lower, 1916
Crocanthes venustula Turner, 1933
Crocanthes warmarensis Park, 2011
Crocanthes xanthistia Meyrick, 1931
Crocanthes zonodesma Lower, 1900

Former species
Crocanthes zonias Meyrick, 1904

References
Natural History Museum Lepidoptera genus database